This page documents the tornadoes and tornado outbreaks of 1949, primarily in the United States. Most recorded tornadoes form in the U.S., although some events may take place internationally. Tornado statistics for older years like this often appear significantly lower than modern years due to fewer reports or confirmed tornadoes.

This was the final year where tornadoes were not officially surveyed by the U.S. Weather Bureau, which would later become the National Weather Service, as well as the final year where tornadoes had no official rating. All documented significant tornadoes prior to 1950 were given unofficial ratings by tornado experts like Thomas P. Grazulis, which this article uses for the ratings below. Most of these records are limited to significant tornadoes; those rated F2 or higher on the Fujita scale, or which caused a fatality. There are also no official tornado counts for each month, so not every month is included in this article. In subsequent years, the documentation of tornadoes became much more widespread and efficient, with the average annual tornado count being around 1,253. Outside the United States, various meteorological organizations, like the European Severe Storms Laboratory rated tornadoes, which are considered official ratings.

Events

United States yearly total

January

January 1 (Denmark)
An F2 tornado struck Varde Municipality, Denmark, destroying the straw roof of a county estate and farm machinery was damaged. The exact location of this tornado is unknown.

January 3

An outbreak produced at least 11 significant tornadoes across Kansas, Louisiana, and Arkansas. One particularly devastating tornado, which was estimated to be at F4 intensity, obliterated Warren, Arkansas, killing 55 people. It is tied with the Fort Smith tornado from 1898 as the deadliest in Arkansas history. A total of 60 people were killed from the outbreak.

January 10 (Finland)

Three waterspouts came ashore in Finland, which included an F2 tornado that struck Joutsa, Finland. The three waterspouts received their ratings from the European Severe Storms Laboratory and Finnish Meteorological Institute.

February

February 2
An estimated F2 tornado destroyed two farm houses southwest of Red Level, Alabama with five injuries in one of the homes. Livestock was killed on both farms as well.

March

March 25–26

On March 25, an estimated F4 tornado touched down northeast of Gorman in Eastland County, Texas and moved northeastward, destroying 15 of the 23 homes on the northwest side of Desdemona, Texas. In all, 16 homes were destroyed and a few farm buildings were hit by the tornado. An F2 tornado touched down in the same county 12 hours later, destroying a switching station. Tornadic activity continued overnight as an estimated F3 tornado struck Crowder, Oklahoma, damaging or destroying 58 homes and businesses and killing two people. A second round of tornadoes struck the Southeast on the afternoon of March 26. The greatest losses were from an estimated F4 tornado that killed 18 people and injured 150 on a path from north of Sheridan to west of Hazen, Arkansas. The worst damage was near England, Arkansas, where 13 people died and 100 homes were damaged or destroyed. An estimated F3 tornado killed five people and injured 30 as it passed through rural areas near Wiville, McCrory, and Balch, Arkansas.

March 30

Four early morning tornadoes caused major damage and casualties in Oklahoma and Kansas. First, a destructive F4 tornado struck Canton, Oklahoma killing four people, injuring 31 and causing $250,000 in damage in the town. The same tornado tore apart many farms in rural areas and killed a boy while he slept in his home east of Longdale. After the tornado lifted, another tornado, estimated at F3 intensity, touched down and caused mostly minor damage as it moved northeastward before intensifying and slamming the town of Blackwell. 100 homes were damaged, 13 more were destroyed, an elementary school was completely leveled, and a seven people were injured. Northwest of this tornado, an F2 tornado touched down and moved through Grant County, destroying six farms and obliterating a school. Another F3 tornado from the original storm touched down in Cowley County, Kansas, hitting five farms and destroying one home. Overall, the outbreak killed four and injured at least 31. That afternoon, an F2 tornado moved through Kemper, Illinois and passed west of Chesterfield, causing roof damage to five buildings in town. Buildings were destroyed on five farms.

April

April 30

An outbreak of at least 15 estimated significant tornadoes struck Texas and Oklahoma. An estimated F3 tornado touched down east of Stella, Oklahoma and moved northeast to just east of Meeker, killing three. Another estimated F3 tornado touched down west of Oberlin and tore a nearly  path to just east of Antlers, killing one. An estimated F4 tornado also moved through Norman, Oklahoma, injuring 48. An estimated F2 tornado killed one person west of Sawyer. The outbreak resulted in eight fatalities and at least 86 injuries.

May

May 6

Two tornadoes caused major damage in New Mexico and Texas. An estimated F3 tornado touched down in New Mexico and moved into Texas, leveling two homes near Bledsoe, Texas. An estimated F4 tornado caused major damage in Sundown, Texas. 14 homes were badly damaged with two being swept away and a car and a truck were thrown considerable distances. A church and parsonage were also leveled, causing two fatalities.

May 13

Two estimated F3 tornadoes touched down in Carson County, Texas northeast of Amarillo, destroying farms, farmhouses, and cars. An estimated F2 tornado also destroyed a home in Potter County, Texas.

May 15

Several strong tornadoes struck the Oklahoma and Texas Panhandles. An estimated F4 tornado hit Amarillo, killing seven people and injuring 82. This tornado remains Amarillo's strongest and costliest tornado. Another estimated F4 tornado injured three people near Stratford after which it crossed into Oklahoma and killed an elderly man near Goodwell. Witnesses described the tornado as sounding like a "low-flying B-29".

May 17

Tornadoes touched down in Texas, Oklahoma, and Nebraska, damaging or destroying numerous structures. One estimated F4 tornado killed one person near Spur, Texas.

May 20–21

A deadly outbreak struck several states. The most notable event was a violent tornado that struck Palestine, Illinois on May 21. The tornado was rated F4 by Grazulis, although some experts rated the tornado F5. A total of 56 people were killed by this outbreak.

June

June 17

Two tornadoes, an estimated F2 and an estimated F3, caused major damage to farm buildings and barns in Northeastern Colorado.

October

October 9–10

A major tornado outbreak struck Oklahoma, Kansas, and Nebraska. An estimated F2 tornado touched down on the north side of Lincoln, Nebraska, destroying barns, killing one person, and injuring three others. An estimated F1 tornado killed one person in Russell, Kansas. An estimated F3 tornado hit Slapout, Oklahoma and moved past Rosston, damaging numerous farms and injuring three people.

October 24 (Sweden)
A "violent tornado" struck Skogstorp, Eskilstuna Municipality in Sweden along a  path. The tornado "threw large trees hundreds of meters". One structure had "the basement roof became a single pile of brick pans." The European Severe Storms Laboratory rated the tornado F2.

August

August 30
An estimated F2 tornado tore the roof and ceilings off of a home in Montgomery, Alabama.

November

November 24

Three deadly tornadoes struck Alabama. An estimated F4 tornado tore through Fairview, Oneonta and Taits Gap, damaging or destroying 32 homes and 84 other structures. 100 head of cattle were killed and several of the homes were completely blown away. It caused 44 injuries and four fatalities with three of the fatalities occurring in an Easley home while the other took place in an Oneonta home. At the same time as this tornado, an estimated F2 tornado traveled from Hackneyville to Northeastern Alexander City. It picked up one house and tossed it  into another house, where it was demolished. All 10 occupants, a woman and nine children, in the first house were killed while 10 more people in the other house were injured. Another estimated F2 tornado struck Sand Mountain, South Henagar, and North Mentone, although the damage path indicated that it only touched down on ridge tops. Three homes were destroyed, seven others were damaged, one person was killed and 20 others were injured. Overall, the tornadoes killed 15 and injured 74.

December

December 11

Multiple tornadoes touched down in Oklahoma, Missouri, Arkansas, and Illinois. An estimated F4 tornado caused major damage in rural areas near Poplar Bluff and Hillard, Missouri, killing six people and injuring 30. An estimated F3 tornado, described as a "skipping column of smoke," hit Providence, Arkansas and moved past Bradford, Arkansas, killing four people and injuring 11.

Notes

See also
 Tornado
 Tornadoes by year
 Tornado records
 Tornado climatology
 Tornado myths
 List of tornado outbreaks
 List of F5 and EF5 tornadoes
 List of North American tornadoes and tornado outbreaks
 List of 21st-century Canadian tornadoes and tornado outbreaks
 List of European tornadoes and tornado outbreaks
 List of tornadoes and tornado outbreaks in Asia
 List of Southern Hemisphere tornadoes and tornado outbreaks
 List of tornadoes striking downtown areas
 List of tornadoes with confirmed satellite tornadoes
 Tornado intensity
 Fujita scale
 Enhanced Fujita scale

References

Torn
Tornado-related lists by year
1949 meteorology